D'Autray is a regional county municipality in the Lanaudière region of Quebec, Canada. Its seat is Berthierville.

The municipality has a land area of 1,249.30 km2 and its population was 42,189 inhabitants as of the 2016 Census. Its largest community is the city of Lavaltrie.

Subdivisions
There are 15 subdivisions within the RCM:

Cities & Towns (3)
 Berthierville
 Lavaltrie
 Saint-Gabriel

Municipalities (9)
 La Visitation-de-l'Île-Dupas
 Lanoraie
 Mandeville
 Saint-Cléophas-de-Brandon
 Saint-Cuthbert
 Saint-Gabriel-de-Brandon
 Saint-Ignace-de-Loyola
 Sainte-Élisabeth
 Sainte-Geneviève-de-Berthier

Parishes (3)
 Saint-Barthélemy
 Saint-Didace
 Saint-Norbert

Demographics

Population

Language

Transportation

Access Routes
Highways and numbered routes that run through the municipality, including external routes that start or finish at the county border:

 Autoroutes
 
 

 Principal Highways
 
 
 

 Secondary Highways
 
 
 

 External Routes
 None

See also
 List of regional county municipalities and equivalent territories in Quebec

References

External links
 MRC d'Autray

Regional county municipalities in Lanaudière
Census divisions of Quebec